The Scooby-Doo and Scrappy-Doo shorts represents the fifth incarnation of the Scooby-Doo franchise.

The original format of four teenagers and their dog(s) solving faux-supernatural mysteries for a half-hour was eschewed for simpler, more comedic adventures that involved real supernatural villains (the villains in previous Scooby episodes were almost always regular humans in disguise).
 
A total of 33 half-hour episodes, each of which included three 7-minute shorts, were produced over three seasons, from 1980 to 1982 on ABC. Thirteen episodes were produced for the 1980–81 season, and seven more for the 1981–82 as segments of The Richie Rich/Scooby-Doo Show. The remaining thirteen episodes were produced as segments of The Scooby & Scrappy-Doo/Puppy Hour for the 1982–83 season. Out of the 99 shorts that were produced, 86 of them feature Scooby-Doo, his nephew Scrappy-Doo and Shaggy without the rest of the Mystery Inc gang, and the other 13 only feature Scrappy-Doo and Yabba-Doo.

Cast 

 Don Messick – Scooby-Doo, Scrappy-Doo, Yabba-Doo (1982)
 Casey Kasem – Norville "Shaggy" Rogers
 Frank Welker – Deputy Dusty (1982)

Episodes 
The following guide only includes 30 minute Scooby-Doo segments from each show. It does not include other series from the original broadcast package shows.

Season 1 (The Richie Rich/Scooby-Doo Show) (1980-81) 
The following ran from 1980 to 1981, as segments on The Richie Rich/Scooby-Doo Show. That show, and the rest of the new 1980 ABC Saturday morning lineup, did not debut until November 8 (instead of the traditional first or second week of September) because of a voice actors' strike.

Season 2 (The Richie Rich/Scooby-Doo Show) (1981) 
The following ran in 1981, as segments on The Richie Rich/Scooby-Doo Show.

Following the final first-run episode on October 31, reruns from the first seasons were rerun alongside episodes from the second season.

Season 3 (The Scooby & Scrappy-Doo/Puppy Hour) (1982) 

The following ran in 1982, as segments of The Scooby & Scrappy-Doo/Puppy Hour. All segments were written and storyboarded at Hanna-Barbera, but were produced and animated by then-sister company Ruby-Spears Enterprises.
Note: The third episode for each air date listed is the Scrappy and Yabba-Doo episode from that date.

Home media 
Warner Home Video (via Hanna-Barbera and Warner Bros. Family Entertainment) released The Richie Rich/Scooby-Doo Show: Volume 1 on DVD in Region 1 on May 20, 2008.

All three seasons are available for download from the iTunes store.

References

External links 
 Official Scooby-Doo website

Scooby-Doo television series
1980s American animated television series
Television series by Hanna-Barbera
1980 American television series debuts
1982 American television series endings
American Broadcasting Company original programming
American children's animated adventure television series
American children's animated comedy television series
American children's animated fantasy television series
American children's animated horror television series
American children's animated mystery television series
American animated television spin-offs
English-language television shows
Television series created by Joe Ruby
Television series created by Ken Spears